Playhouse (sometimes stylized as PlayHouse, PlayHOUSE or playHouSE) is a 2018 Philippine drama television series starring Zanjoe Marudo and Angelica Panganiban. The series aired on ABS-CBN's PrimeTanghali noontime block and worldwide via The Filipino Channel from September 17, 2018 to March 22, 2019, replacing Sana Dalawa ang Puso and was replaced by Nang Ngumiti ang Langit.

Premise
Young married couple Patty and Marlon are on the brink of calling it quits when an unexpected need to parent a godchild forces them to be together again. In their parenthood journey, they will find themselves giving love a second chance and transforming their house into a home.

Cast and characters

Main
 Zanjoe Marudo as Marlon Ilaban
 Angelica Panganiban as Patricia "Patty" Calumpang-Ilaban
 JJ Quilantang as Robin John Cortes

Supporting
 Carlo Aquino as Dr. Harold Miguel
 Isabelle Daza as Leah Samonte 
 Alex Medina as Manuelito "Manny" Bradford Hawkins
 Smokey Manaloto as Noli Calumpang
 Nadia Montenegro as Belen Calumpang
 Dexter Doria as Rebecca "Lola Becca" Ilaban
 Malou de Guzman as Yaya Lena Santos
 Kean Cipriano as Renato "Ato" Payuan 
 Maxene Magalona as Natalia Cortes-Smith
 Jomari Angeles as Lorenzo "Renz" Calumpang
 Ingrid dela Paz as Sandra Calumpang
 Kisses Delavin as Shiela Ubaldo
 Donny Pangilinan as Ezekiel "Zeke" Domingo
 Ariella Arida as Irene Flores
 AC Bonifacio as Cindy Baluyot
 Ian Galliguez as Mitchie de Vera
 Kazel Kinouchi as Olivia "Liv" Asuncion
 Nor Domingo as Atty. Ramon Sacay
 Nick Lizaso as Marcial Reyes
 Lovely Rivero as Cielo Reyes-Domingo
 Ivan Padilla as Peter Smith
 Ana De Leon as Nicole

Guest
 Denise Laurel as Emily Grace L. Cortes 
 Patrick Garcia as Brad V. Cortes
 Yñigo Delen as young Marlon 
 Louise Abuel as Teen Marlon 
 Ces Quesada as Josie Salazar
 Yayo Aguila as Catherine "Cathy" Calumpang
 Michael Flores as Roger Cuevas 
 Richard Quan as Eli Domingo
 Anna Marin as Rowena Yamamoto
 Jong Cuenco as Dr. Greg Miguel
 Arlene Muhlach as Barbara "Barang" Cuevas
 Vanessa Alariao as Nurse Marge

Broadcast
Playhouse premiered on September 17, 2018.

This is the final drama series produced by GMO Unit, prior to the latter's dissolution.

Reception

See also
 List of programs broadcast by ABS-CBN
 List of ABS-CBN drama series

References

External links
 
 

ABS-CBN drama series
Philippine romantic comedy television series
2018 Philippine television series debuts
2019 Philippine television series endings
Filipino-language television shows
Television shows set in the Philippines